Wudi may refer to:

Wudi County, in Binzhou, Shandong, China
Wudi, the atonal pinyin for the legendary Five Emperors
Wudi, the atonal pinyin for various emperors named Wu
Wǔdì (五帝 "Five Deities") in Chinese religion
 WUDI-LD, a defunct low-power television station (channel 27) formerly licensed to serve Myrtle Beach, South Carolina, United States
 Wudi, or Guan Yu as the "God of war"

See also
 Wu Di (disambiguation)